The "Song of General Kim Il-sung" (Korean: 김일성장군의 노래) is a North Korean marching song composed by Kim Won-gyun in 1946. As a part of an ongoing cult of personality, the song praising Kim Il-sung, North Korea's "Eternal President", who died in 1994, is still widely played in the country. It is often considered to be the de facto national anthem in North Korea. 

The song is a four-square march. It features paired two bar phrases in an A-B-A form, with dotted rhythms. Percussion and brass instrumentation is intended to enhance the revolutionary tone of the song.

The song, composed in 1946, is the earliest known work of art mentioning Kim Il-sung, and thus can be said to mark the beginning of his personality cult.

In the early 1980s Kim Jong-il began promoting the song and it has since replaced "Aegukka", the national anthem, as the most important song and the de facto anthem played in public gatherings in the country. North Koreans typically know the lyrics by heart, though this seems to have changed under his grandson, Kim Jong-un.

The first two bars of the song are used as an interval signal on North Korean radio and television. According to North Korean sources, their satellites Kwangmyŏngsŏng-1, launched in 1998, and Kwangmyŏngsŏng-2, supposedly launched in a test on 5 April 2009, are broadcasting this song among other data.

Emulating a Buddhist tradition of carving sutras, its lyrics are carved in stones as well as the Pyongyang Arch of Triumph.

The song is played by the North Korean state television and Voice of Korea at the start of broadcasts each day.

See also 
"Song of General Kim Jong-il"

References

External links 

"The Song of General Kim Il-sung" (mp3) at Naenara
 Lyrics in Korean and English
Score with English lyrics at Naenara
 Orchestral choir performance

1946 songs
North Korean propaganda songs
Propaganda in North Korea
North Korean songs
Songs about Kim Il-sung
North Korean military marches
Propaganda songs